King of Diamonds or The Money King (Italian: Il re di denari) is a 1936 Italian "white-telephones" comedy film directed by Enrico Guazzoni and starring Angelo Musco, Rosina Anselmi, and Mario Pisu.

Cast

References

Bibliography 
 Goble, Alan. The Complete Index to Literary Sources in Film. Walter de Gruyter, 1999.

External links 
 

1936 comedy films
Italian comedy films
1936 films
1930s Italian-language films
Films directed by Enrico Guazzoni
Films set in Rome
Italian black-and-white films
1930s Italian films